Coleophora asthenella is a moth of the family Coleophoridae. It is found in the western part of the Mediterranean region.

The larvae feed on Tamarix africana. Larvae can be found in May.

References

asthenella
Moths described in 1893
Moths of Europe
Moths of Africa